Rosa Fontana is a Spanish actress, who was born as Rosa Engracia Sevilla Plo on January 21, 1938 in Zaragoza. She appeared in many Spanish films and TV series, and she also worked in theatre.

Filmography

Films 
¡Se armó el belén! – Maruji
Vente a Alemania, Pepe
Hay que educar a papá
Las tres perfectas casadas
Nothing Less Than a Real Man
Celos, amor y mercado común
Cinco almohadas para una noche
Crónica del alba. Valentina
Lala – Lucía

TV series
Ni pobre ni rico, sino todo lo contrario
Diálogos de Carmelitas
Aquí no hay quien viva

Personal life 
Rosa Fontana's father was poet Avelino Sevilla Hernández, whilst her husbands were Rafael Rivelles and Carlos Manuel Lemos, son of Carlos Lemos (actor). The daughter of Rosa Fontana is Esperanza Lemos, who is also an actress.

References

1938 births
Living people
Spanish stage actresses
Actors from the Valencian Community
Spanish film actresses
20th-century Spanish actresses
21st-century Spanish actresses